Boland Lake is an endorheic lake in geographic La Salle Township in the Unorganized North Part of Nipissing District in Northeastern Ontario, Canada. The lake has one, unnamed island.

Access
Boland Lake lies on the north side of a tertiary road that leads: from Diver northeast to the community of McLaren's Bay on Lake Timiskaming; or, via a subsequent branching tertiary road, southeast to Ontario Highway 63, at a point about halfway between that highway's crossing over the Jocko River and Lake Timiskaming.

Recreation
The Boland Lake campsite of the McConnell Lake Campgrounds is on the southern shore of the lake with road access.

See also
List of lakes in Ontario

References

Lakes of Nipissing District